The David di Donatello Award for Best Director (Italian: David di Donatello per il miglior regista) is a film award presented annually by the Accademia del Cinema Italiano (ACI, Academy of Italian Cinema) to recognize the outstanding direction of a film director who has worked within the Italian film industry during the year preceding the ceremony. The award was first given in 1956, and became competitive in 1981. 

Nominees and winners are selected via runoff voting by all the members of the Accademia. 

Francesco Rosi is the record holder with six awards in the category, received from 1965 to 1997, followed by Mario Monicelli and Giuseppe Tornatore with four.

Winners and nominees
Below, winners are listed first in the colored row, followed by other nominees.

1950s

1960s

1970s

1980s

1990s

2000s

2010s

Multiple wins and nominations

The following individuals have won multiple Best Director awards:

The following directors have received three or more Best Director nominations (* indicates no wins):

See also 
 Nastro d'Argento for Best Director
 Academy Award for Best Director
 Cinema of Italy

References

External links
 
 Daviddidonatello.it (official website)

David di Donatello
Awards for best director